The Sandlot franchise consists of American coming-of-age sport-comedy installments including one theatrical film, and two straight-to-home video sequel films. The plot centers around preadolescent baseball fans, and their comedic adventures growing up as neighborhood friends. The first film was met with mixed-to-positive critical reception, while it was a financial success. Spawning a franchise, it has since been revered as a cult classic movie.

The franchise will continue with a prequel film, and a legacy sequel television series in development. The prequel is intended to be a theatrical release, while the sequel series will be released via streaming service as an exclusive on Disney+.

Films

The Sandlot (1993)

In 1962 America, Scott "Scotty" Smalls moves to a new neighborhood with his mother and stepfather. Scotty struggles to make new friends. Eventually he follows a group of local boys to the small baseball diamond that they affectionately call "The Sandlot", and watches them play an improvised ballgame. As the majority of the gang at first picks on him, the star player of the team named Benjamin "Benny" Franklin Rodgriguez invites him to join them. All together they quickly learn that his sports skills are severely lacking. Together, they have pre-teen coming of age experiences and share comical incidents.

One day when the team wants to play baseball, but do not have all of the necessary equipment, Scotty volunteers his stepdad's collector's item prized ball. When Benny immediately hits a home run into the fenced-in yard of Mr. Mertle next door, Scotty goes to retrieve it before his friends panickingly stop him from doing so. Together they tell him he will never get it back, explaining the legend of "The Beast" that lives there. Hopeless and helpless, Scotty exclaims that it was signed by George "Babe" Ruth Jr., the group of friends devise a plan to get the legendary ball back before Scotty's stepdad notices it is missing.

The Sandlot 2 (2005)

In 1972 America, a new gang of young baseball-fanatics spend their free time at the Sandlot. One day they decide to try something different by launching an authentic NASA model rocket that belongs to one of their parents. When the object accidentally lands in the neighboring cluttered yard belonging to Mr. Mertle, the group of friends must conquer their fears and return the rocket before it's realized to be missing. Together they seek to outsmart the local folklore of the neighbor's dangerous pet that they call "The Great Fear".

The Sandlot: Heading Home (2007)

Tommy "Santa" Santorelli is a Major League Baseball star for the Los Angeles Dodgers, whose hot streak and impressive stats have caused an increase in his egotistical nature. During a game, Tommy steps up to the plate intending to hit another home run. Instead, a speeding fastball beams him in the head, knocking him out. Waking up, Tommy finds that his conscious-self has inexplicably been transported back in time to 1976 in his preadolescent age, when he first discovered his love for baseball with his friends and coaches (Benny and Squints) at The Sandlot. Re-living his early memories of the sport, causes a change within him and reminds him of why he loves the game.

Future
In 2018, a prequel film was revealed to be in development. David Mickey Evans serves as co-writer with Austin Reynolds. The plot takes place in the 1950s. Colin Greten and Daria Cercek will serve as producers for the project.

Television
In April 2019, a sequel television series was announced to be in development as a Disney+ exclusive streaming show. David Mickey Evans will serve as creator, screenwriter, executive producer, and showrunner for the series. Each of the original cast members are confirmed to reprise their roles from the first film. The series takes place during the 1980s with each of the original characters, now in their 30's, coaching their collective children.

Main cast and characters

Additional crew and production details

Reception

Box office and financial performance

Critical and public response

Notes

References

American film series
Sandlot, The (franchise)
Sandlot, The (franchise)